Armstrong (also known as Armstrongs) is a town in Victoria, Australia, located on the Western Highway, north of Ararat, in the local government area of Rural City of Ararat.

The town began as a gold-mining settlement, with a Post Office (Armstrong's) opening on 1 January 1859, and had a peak population of 516.

The Melbourne to Adelaide railway passes through the town. In 1938, Armstrong was the site of an experimental installation of a radical form of railway safeworking intended to bring about cost savings. It resulted in seven years of tortuous bureaucratic decision making.

References

Towns in Victoria (Australia)
Wimmera
Mining towns in Victoria (Australia)